Leonid Kamlochuk (born July 4, 1974) is a Ukrainian sprint canoer who competed in the early 2000s. He was eliminated in the semifinals of the C-2 1000 m event at the 2000 Summer Olympics in Sydney.

References
Sports-Reference.com profile

1974 births
Canoeists at the 2000 Summer Olympics
Living people
Olympic canoeists of Ukraine
Ukrainian male canoeists
Place of birth missing (living people)
21st-century Ukrainian people